Nonza is a commune in the Haute-Corse department of France on the island of Corsica.

Population

See also
Communes of the Haute-Corse department
 Torra di Nonza

References

Communes of Haute-Corse
Haute-Corse communes articles needing translation from French Wikipedia